P62 may refer to:

Naval vessels
 , a submarine of the Royal Navy
 , a corvette of the Indian Navy
 , an offshore patrol vessel of the Irish Naval Service

Other uses
 Curtiss XP-62, an American prototype interceptor aircraft
 Nucleoporin 62, a protein complex associated with the nuclear envelope
 Papyrus 62, a biblical manuscript
 Sequestosome 1, ubiquitin-binding protein p62
 P62, a state regional road in Latvia